Brigham Young University Television International (BYUtv International)  was a Utah-based cable and satellite television channel that broadcast throughout the American continents and parts of Europe free of charge. Its headquarters are located on the Brigham Young University campus in Provo, Utah. It was founded in 2007 and shut down in 2018. As of January 2013, BYUtv International was  available to 6.7 million households. Its content was available in Spanish and Portuguese and focused on world cultures, families, and doctrine from The Church of Jesus Christ of Latter-day Saints. The channel, run by station manager Saul Leal, was nominated for 11 Emmy awards, winning five. Its slogan was “discovering cultures, inspiring lives.”

History
BYUtv International started as a result of a request to provide BYUtv's content in Spanish and Portuguese. A translation team was brought on in 2008, and in 2009 it started producing original content.

On June 30, 2018, BYU TV International ceased operations.

Programming
BYUtv International provided 24-hour programming in both Spanish and Portuguese. 25% of its content is original and the rest comes from popular television channels. All of its content, whether original or not, is translated into Spanish and Portuguese and voiced over by BYU students, professionals, and local third party translation companies.

Nexos
Nexos is a weekly program about arts, culture, news, technology, lifestyle and community. “Nexos” is Spanish for “links” or “linking” and tries to connect different cultures. It is hosted by Brigham Young University students and reporters from Latin America and is specifically geared towards Latin American youth, although it is watched by people of all ages. It is broadcast to Latin America in both Spanish and Portuguese. It won an Emmy in the fall of 2011 and won its second Telly in the beginning of 2012.

Conexão
This show includes a variety of stories, interviews and segments about topics such as best of web, music, fashion, arts, culture and sports, among others. It is produced in Portuguese and hosted by Brigham Young University students from Brazil. Its cast has produced episodes in the Brazilian cities of Rio de Janeiro and Florianópolis, and also in Utah. Its content focuses mainly on Brazil and its culture. It was awarded an Emmy in 2012 for Arts/Entertainment.

Entrepreneurs
Entrepreneurs is a show designed to teach how to start and maintain a business. The show is intended for aspiring entrepreneurs who need direction and tips on how to make it in the business world. Successful entrepreneurs who know the business worlds of Latin America and the United States are interviewed and give suggestions on how to be successful in business. It also encourages youth to give back to their community as they are able.

Community Heroes
This program seeks to help people become aware of how people are doing good in their communities and around the world. It tells the stories of Latin American individuals and their communities, showing their lifestyles and how they impact those around them. It encourages viewers to engage in their communities and serve others. It was awarded an Emmy in 2012 for Human Interest.

Hidden Treasures
This show consists of several mini-series; each is focused on a specific country and is filmed in docu-performance style. It shows real musicians and artists and includes live performances of their music. Some of the groups and individuals featured on this show include Trio Miramar (a Mexican guitar group), Edgar Leónides (a Colombian bard and music teacher), and the Mexican percussion group Os Tamborileiros de Linares.

Grandma’s Kitchen
This show highlights Latin American grandmothers, who share their special recipes and show viewers how to make traditional dishes in various countries throughout Latin America. This series shows how the dishes are prepared, starting at the market where the ingredients are bought and ending at the dinner table where the host and the grandmother featured eat the meal they have made. It was awarded an Emmy in 2012 for History/Culture.

Sports
BYUtv International covers the Brigham Young University American football, soccer, volleyball, basketball, baseball, softball, and gymnastics teams. It provides live commentary in Spanish and Portuguese. It is produced by BYUtv International in conjunction with BYUtv and is broadcast to Latin America. It was awarded an Emmy in 2012 for Sports.

Against All Odds
This family game show involves parents and children as they compete in various challenges testing how well they know each other. Questions vary from text messaging to trivia about each other's life. It is broadcast throughout Latin America in both Spanish and Portuguese.

Emmys
BYUtv International has been nominated for 11 Emmys in the past two years and has won 5. The following original shows have won Emmys:

Conexão
Emmy Category: Arts/Entertainment

Type: Program/Special

Producer: Luiz Malaman

Executive Producer: Saul Leal

Grandma’s Kitchen (La Cocina de la Abuela)
Emmy Category: Historic/Cultural

Type: Program Feature/Segment or Program/Special

Executive Producers: Luiz Malaman and Saul Leal

Community Heroes (Heroes de La Comunidad)
Emmy Category: Human Interest

Type: Program Feature/Segment or Program/Special

Executive Producers: Luiz Malaman and Saul Leal

Football – Fall Season (Spanish/Portuguese Coverage)
Emmy Category: Sporting Event/Game

Type: Live/unedited

Producers: Luiz Malaman and Mikel Minor

Executive Producer: Saul Leal

Staff
BYUtv International started in 2007 with just one employee, Saul Leal. In 2008 the channel added a producer, and in 2008 a translation department was added. The post production manager was hired in 2008 and a voice over department was added in 2008. The distribution department was added in 2008.

BYUtv International's full-time employees work closely with the student employees, giving them feedback and mentoring during their time with the channel.

References

External links
 BYU Television International

Religious television stations in the United States
Defunct television networks in the United States
Brigham Young University
Commercial-free television networks
Television channels and stations established in 2007
Television channels and stations disestablished in 2018
2007 establishments in Utah
2018 disestablishments in Utah